Kamil Özdemir Tolon, known as Kamil Tolon (29 February 1912 – 23 July 1978), was a Turkish businessperson, industrialist and inventor, known for making the first electric engine of Turkey. Tolon was born in 1912 in Istanbul. He had his secondary and university education in Ankara. He wanted to become an engineer, but went to the Ankara University Faculty of Law instead due to the lack of engineering schools, from which he graduated in 1935. Tolon started working as a PTT inspector after university, but left the job not long after.

After moving to Bursa, he founded Tolon Makina in 1937, where he started to produce several machines. In 1944, he was drafted into the army, where he continued working on new inventions to be used for the army. After returning from the army, Tolon started producing combine harvesters, water pumps, washing machines and dish washers. While initially using imported engines, he was later forced to build his own engine by Adnan Menderes and made the first electric engine of Turkey.

Tolon moved to a new factory after a fire damaged his workshop in 1958. The factory started production in 1960 and resulted in an increase of sales. He was a founding member of the Justice Party and became a chairman at the Bursa Chamber of Commerce and Industry. Regarded as one of the most important figures in Turkish industrialism, Kamil Tolon died on 23 July 1978 in Geneva, Switzerland, from an embolism.

Early and personal life 
Kamil Tolon was born on 29 February 1912 in Beylerbeyi, Istanbul as the second child of six children in a family known as Saatçioğulları. He had his primary education in several different provinces of Turkey. Tolon went high school at a boarding school in Ankara, where he graduated from in September 1935 as Muhittin oğlu Kamil Efendi. During his time in high school, he was interested in engineering. His first invention was a music box, which he made during high school. However, due to the lack of engineering faculties at the time, Tolon had to go to Ankara University Faculty of Law instead. At the faculty of law, he met several future politicians, including Adnan Menderes, the 9th prime minister of Turkey. Tolon graduated from university on 4 July 1935.

In 1935, with the new Surname Law in effect, he got the surname Tolonçok, meaning "very talented". He changed it to simply Tolon later in 1944. In 1936, Tolon married Müeyyet Bulut, whom he had two daughters with, born in 1936 and 1942. They divorced in 1942. His older, Abatun, stayed with him, while his younger daughter, Barkın, stayed with her mother. In February 1943, Tolon married his second wife, Muzaffer Biliktü. They also had two children: his son Dara (born 1944) and daughter Cana (born 1949). Despite the divorce, Tolon and Müeyyet Bulut still held family reunions, with Cana even knowing Bulut as her aunt.

Career

PTT inspector and return to engineering 

After graduation, Tolon started to work at PTT as an inspector. He was sent to Anatolia for his first insepction. When the villager guiding him put the cookie given by Tolon between bread to eat it, he decided to resign from PTT since there was "a lot to do for this country". He went to an engineering school in France for a brief period, before opening a shop in Bursa in 1937 and named it Tolon Makina. In 1942, Tolon met . The two split in 1944 after Batıca said that engineering was mostly Tolon's thing to do. Following this, Tolon started to work at the workshop with his wife.

Military draft 
In 1944, Tolon was draftified into the army for a third time and was sent to Nara, Çanakkale. He continued his work during the army; most importantly building mine cutting machines in serial production, which were used to cleanup naval mines in the Dardanelles left from World War I. He spent 5 months cleaning mines and assisting soldiers in the use of his machine. Following regular electricity outages in his military squad, he made an electricity generator, as well as a portable washing machine for soldiers who were on a field mission. The washing machine was assembled at the back of a truck and was used in the army for "many years".

Return from military and first electric engine 

The same year he returned to Bursa from the military, he made warping machines, sawing machines and drills in his workshop. In 1948 and 1949, Tolon manufactured a combine harvester and water pumps for farmers. The government decided to buy the harvester, but needed to test the machine. A European manufacturer also joined the testing, but secretly installed iron bars on the farm land where the test took place, causing the harvester to break.

Tolon also manufactured washing machines and dish washers in his workhop, which were the first of the country. He got the patents of these products in 1953. Washing machines at the time were only owned by rich people due to their price as they had to be imported. Tolon's machine allowed many families to get one. The copper wires needed for the machines were processed in his own workshop and everything apart from the engines were built by Tolon. The engines were imported from abroad and had an import quota. He had trouble selling the dish washer, as locals at the time thought that washing by hand was cleaner. This led to him stopping its production.

While visiting Bursa, Adnan Menderes told Tolon that the import quota was scrapped, and forced him to manufacture his own engine. This led to the manufacture of the first electric engine of Turkey, which were used for Tolon's machines. The machines were considered to be of high quality; "these domestic washing machines are the same as, or even more durable and practical than European goods."

Relocation due to fire 
In December 1957, Tolon bought a  field near Soğukpınarlı. On 24 August 1958, a major fire destroyed 1130 shops at Kapalıçarşı and Cumhuriyet Street, including Tolon's shop. Taking advantage of the chaos, several of his machines were looted by people. Despite the fire completely burning down his workshop, he temporarily continued his work in tents of the Turkish Red Crescent. Tolon was the first to resume production of those who were affected by the fire.

Following the fire, Tolon started to plan a factory at the field near Soğukpınarlı. Construction began in 1959, with Tolon himself making the drawings and being the architect. Production of machines at the factory started in 1960. Sales increased with the new factory, with Tolon opening locations at 64 of 67 provinces in the country. The model was produced until the mid-1960s.

Later ventures 
Kamil Tolon was the chairman of the executive board of Bursa Chamber of Commerce and Industry from 1963 to 1965 and played a vital role in the founding of the first organized industrial zone of Turkey. He was one of the founding members of the Justice Party. He considered becoming a member of the Grand National Assembly of Turkey, but wasn't able to due to an "out of sorts environment". Tolon was one of the 28 people allowed to vote to select the chairman of the party in 1964.

He died on 23 July 1978 in Geneva, Switzerland after suffering from an embolism following a heart surgery at the age of 66. His is buried in the Emir Sultan Cemetery, Bursa, next to the Emir Sultan Mosque. His son Dara moved the factory to İzmir after his death. The old factory in Bursa was demolished in 2017 as part of an urban renewal project.

Legacy 
Kamil Tolon is thought to be an important figure in Turkish industrialism. Süleyman Demirel considered Kamil Tolon to be of the people who initiated industrialization movements in Bursa and across the whole country. He added that Tolon had made "great contributions" for him to become the leader of the Justice Party. According to a Sabah article from 2004, when mothers were asked to name a company from their era, many said Tolon first. The newspaper joked that "even Greeks were using the machines of Tolon." An arts and science school in Osmangazi, Bursa, is named after Tolon.

Notes

References

Citations

Bibliography

Further reading

External links 

1912 births
1978 deaths
20th-century Turkish businesspeople
20th-century Turkish engineers
Turkish inventors
Turks from the Ottoman Empire
20th-century people from the Ottoman Empire